This is a list of sweets and desserts found in Argentine cuisine.

See also
 List of desserts

References

External links
 

 
Argentina